The Chief Coroner of England and Wales is the most senior coroner in England and Wales, and supervises the work of other coroners in that jurisdiction.

The post was created by the passing of the Coroners and Justice Act 2009 into law, and the first Chief Coroner was appointed in 2012.

Post holders 

Since 2009, three men have held the position. With some of their major inquests, they are:

 
 
 2017 Westminster attack
 2017 London Bridge attack
 2019 London Bridge stabbings

References

External links 

 

Coroners
England and Wales
2012 establishments in the United Kingdom